Just Who I Am: Poets & Pirates is the eleventh studio album by American country music artist Kenny Chesney. It was released on September 11, 2007 via BNA Records.  The album was leaked on the Internet on September 5, 2007. It produced four singles on the US Billboard Hot Country Songs chart between 2007 and 2008, three of which reached number one. The album also includes duets with George Strait and Joe Walsh. This is Chesney’s only album to date with no songs written or co-written by him.

Content
The album's first two singles are "Never Wanted Nothing More" and "Don't Blink", which were officially released to country radio in June and September 2007. Both singles  reached number one the Hot Country Songs charts in late 2007, as did "Better as a Memory" (the fourth and final single) in June 2008. "Shiftwork" is a duet with George Strait. It was released as the album's third single in December 2007. It peaked at number 2 in early 2008. The song "Wild Ride", a duet with Joe Walsh, was originally recorded by Dwight Yoakam on his 1993 album This Time.

Critical reception
The album represented a move by Chesney to a more gulf and western sound with a number of "breezy, steel-drum island songs."

Commercial performance
Just Who I Am: Poets & Pirates debuted at number three on the US Billboard 200 chart, selling 387,000 copies in first week. The album had the best weekly sales of any country album since the Dixie Chicks' Taking the Long Way in May 2006 As of August 2008, the album has sold 1.4 million copies in the United States. On December 10, 2007, the album was certified platinum by the Recording Industry Association of America (RIAA) for sales of over a million copies in the United States.

Track listing

Personnel
As listed in liner notes.

 Wyatt Beard – background vocals
 William F. Bowman – acoustic guitar
 Bekka Bramlett – background vocals
 Mat Britain – steel drums
 Pat Buchanan – electric guitar
 Buddy Cannon – background vocals
 Melonie Cannon – background vocals
 Kenny Chesney – lead vocals
 Jeff Coffin – tenor saxophone
 Eric Darken – percussion
 Dan Dugmore – steel guitar
 Chris Dunn – trombone
 Sonny Garrish – steel guitar, Dobro
 Vince Gill – electric guitar
 Kenny Greenberg – electric guitar
 Rob Hajacos – fiddle
 Tim Hensley – background vocals
 Steve Herman – trumpet
 John Hobbs – piano, keyboards
 Jim Horn – baritone saxophone
 Paul Leim – drums, percussion
 Randy McCormick – Hammond B-3 organ, piano, keyboards, synthesizer, Wurlitzer
 Jonell Mosser – background vocals
 Larry Paxton – bass guitar, upright bass
 Gary Prim – Hammond B-3 organ, piano, keyboards
 Jon Randall – background vocals
 Mickey Raphael – harmonica
 Chris Stapleton – acoustic guitar
 George Strait – duet vocals on "Shiftwork"
 Scott Vestal – banjo
 Joe Walsh – electric guitar and talk box on "Wild Ride" 
 Quentin Ware, Jr. – trumpet
 John Willis – acoustic guitar, electric guitar, talk box guitar, gut string guitar
 Andrea Zonn – background vocals

Charts

Weekly charts

Year-end charts

Singles

Certifications

References

External links
 

2007 albums
BNA Records albums
Kenny Chesney albums
Albums produced by Buddy Cannon